Manvel Mamoyan is an Armenian fitness and bodybuilding trainer, fitness blogger, and three times Guinness World Records holder. He is also a multiple record holder of Armenian Book of Records (Dyutsaznagirk).

Biography

Manvel was born on April 6, 1993 in Yerevan. Currently works as fitness and bodybuilding trainer. He has been practising sports since 10, when he started attending Judo classes.

In 2011-2013 he served in the Armenian Armed Forces.

Records 

Until 18, Manvel also tried himself in Greco-Roman and freestyle wrestling. Manvel set his 11th record in Armenia when he was only 17. His first record was set in Dyutsaznagirk by doing sit up - abdominal exercise for 2 h. 46 min for 3511 reps. For the second time he appeared in Dyutsaznagirk for the most push-ups with one arm using back of the hand in one minute - 89 reps.

2015-2016 
After returning from the army, Manvel set a Guinness world record in October 23, 2015. He did 27 handstand push-ups in a minute. In order to complete one handstand push-up, Manvel’s elbows had to reach 90 degrees or less and then he had to fully straighten his arms. His legs also had to be straight or cross his ankles. He did the exercise in 48,3 seconds. Manvel didn’t have any injury before his performance, and the record was set. He dedicated his victory to the memory of the Genocide of Armenian and Yazidi people  promised to update his record throughout the year.

2016-2017 
On 25 August, 2016 Manvel dedicated his record in memory of the victims of the 2016 April Four-Day War unleashed in Nagorno-Karabakh. In response to the murder of Hayk Torosyan, Hrant Gharibyan and his compatriot Kyaram Sloyan by Azeris, Manvel Mamoyan set a new record: however, in August, 2016 he couldn’t exceed the record (84 push-ups) of the Canadian Roy Berger from his first performance in the Freedom Square, Yerevan, by reaching 83 reps. According to the Guinness World Records’ rules the athlete has a right to perform the exercise for 3 sets. Manvel managed to set the desired record from his second performance, after having a rest. By doing push-ups for 86 reps in a minute, the athlete exceeded the previous record and set a record in the Guinness World Records.

In one his interviews Manvel told  about his desire to set 10 records in Guinness World Records in a year, particularly by through the Flag exercise, which was set as a record a few years ago by him and was performed for only 20 seconds. It was included in Dyutsaznagirk. He also mentioned he strives to set records more for Guinness World Records. In 2016 Manvel fell behind 5-6 seconds of setting a new world record and the record was 1 min. 5 sec. 71 millisec.

2017-2018 
In 2017 Manvel set 4 records in handstand push-ups. He did the exercise 37 reps in a minute. With this result then he set a new record by doing 37 reps non-stop in a minute.     

For his second record he did the same exercise 55 reps in 3 minutes. However, Manvel's last and most important result was doing push-ups for 352 reps in an hour. According to him, the achieved most result was 300 reps and he wished to surpass that record.  

In 2017 Manvel also set a record for the Most jump squats in one minute (male), with 67 reps per minute.

References

Bibliography 
 
 

1993 births
Living people
Guinness World Records
Sportspeople from Yerevan
Male bodybuilders